Love & Life may refer to:

Love & Life (Eric Benét album), 2008
Love & Life (LaToya London album), 2005
Love & Life (Mary J. Blige album), 2003
Love & Life: The Very Best of Diana Ross, 2001
Love and Life, an album by Morris Albert, 1977
Love and Life, a painting by George Frederic Watts

See also
Love & Life, The Album, a 2012 album by Dok2
Love & Live (disambiguation)
Love Life (disambiguation)